Screen Souvenirs is a 1932 American short film. At the 5th Academy Awards, held in 1932, it was nominated for an Academy Award  for Best Short Subject (Novelty).

References

External links

1932 films
1932 short films
American black-and-white films
Paramount Pictures short films
American short films
1930s English-language films